Gustav Wagner (1911–1980) was an Austrian Nazi SS officer, deputy commander of Sobibór extermination camp, and Holocaust perpetrator.

Gustav Wagner may also refer to:

Gustav Wagner (Wehrmacht) (1890–1951), German Generalmajor in the Wehrmacht during World War II
Gustav Wagner (bobsledder) (1901–1972), Luxembourgian bobsledder

See also
Wagner (surname)